Desulfovibrio dechloracetivorans is a bacterium. It is a Gram-negative, anaerobic, motile, short curved rod that grows by coupling the reductive dechlorination of 2-chlorophenol to the oxidation of acetate.

References

Further reading
Staley, James T., et al. "Bergey's manual of systematic bacteriology, vol. 3. "Williams and Wilkins, Baltimore, MD (2012).

External links 
LPSN

Bacteria described in 2001
Desulfovibrio